Mawlawi Hanif Shah al-Hussaini was elected to represent Khost Province in Afghanistan's Wolesi Jirga, the lower house of its National Legislature, in 2005.

A report on Khost prepared at the Navy Postgraduate School stated that he "was associated with Hezbi Islami, and possibly the Qanooni faction".
It stated that he was a member of the Pashtun ethnic group.
It stated he was a high school graduate.
It stated he sat on the Justice Committee.

References

Living people
Politicians of Khost Province
Members of the House of the People (Afghanistan)
Hezbi Islami politicians
Year of birth missing (living people)